Carlos Hernández Alarcón (born 15 September 1990) is a Spanish professional footballer who plays for CD Eldense as a central defender.

Club career
Born in Jaén, Andalusia, Hernández finished his youth career with local club Real Jaén, making his senior debut with their reserves in the regional leagues. He was promoted to the first team in the summer of 2011, appearing in 37 matches in his first season as they failed to promote from Segunda División B.

On 14 July 2012, Hernández signed with Real Zaragoza, who paid €70,000 for his services, He was immediately assigned to the reserves, also in the third division.

Hernández joined CE Sabadell FC of Segunda División on 9 August 2013. He played his first game as a professional on the 18th, featuring the full 90 minutes and scoring his side's second goal in a 4–0 home win against RCD Mallorca.

On 4 July 2015, Hernández moved to CD Lugo in the same league after agreeing to a two-year deal. On 28 June 2017, he signed a two-year contract with Real Oviedo also in the second tier. He scored a career-best six goals in his first season, helping to a seventh-place finish.

On 28 June 2021, the free agent Hernández signed a two-year deal with AD Alcorcón, still in division two.

References

External links

1990 births
Living people
Spanish footballers
Footballers from Jaén, Spain
Association football defenders
Segunda División players
Segunda División B players
Primera Federación players
Divisiones Regionales de Fútbol players
Real Jaén footballers
Real Zaragoza B players
CE Sabadell FC footballers
CD Lugo players
Real Oviedo players
AD Alcorcón footballers
CD Eldense footballers